Svetlana Gromenkova is a poker player who won the 2008 World Series of Poker $1,000 Ladies - No-Limit Hold'em. As of 2008, her total WSOP tournament winnings exceed $240,830.

Gromenkova was born in and raised in Moscow, but during her education in The Maurice Thorez Moscow Institute of Foreign Languages she moved to New York City. In Russia, she played bridge professionally, but after she learned poker in the US, she started to play online poker. Winning at 2008 World Series of Poker was her first major title.

World Series of Poker bracelets

References

American poker players
World Series of Poker bracelet winners
Female poker players
Living people
Year of birth missing (living people)